George Grosz (born Georg Ehrenfried Groß; July 26, 1893 – July 6, 1959) was a German artist known especially for his caricatural drawings and paintings of Berlin life in the 1920s. He was a prominent member of the Berlin Dada and New Objectivity groups during the Weimar Republic. He emigrated to the United States in 1933, and became a naturalized citizen in 1938. Abandoning the style and subject matter of his earlier work, he exhibited regularly and taught for many years at the Art Students League of New York. In 1959 he returned to Berlin, where he died shortly afterwards.

Early life and education

Grosz was born Georg Ehrenfried Groß in Berlin, Germany, the third child of a pub owner. His parents were devoutly Lutheran. Grosz grew up in the Pomeranian town of Stolp (now Słupsk, Poland). After his father's death in 1900, he moved to the Wedding district of Berlin with his mother and sisters. At the urging of his cousin, the young Grosz began attending a weekly drawing class taught by a local painter named Grot. Grosz developed his skills further by drawing meticulous copies of the drinking scenes of Eduard von Grützner, and by drawing imaginary battle scenes. He was expelled from school in 1908 for insubordination. 

From 1909 to 1911, he studied at the Dresden Academy of Fine Arts, where his teachers were Richard Müller, Robert Sterl, Raphael Wehle, and Osmar Schindler. His first published drawing was in the satirical magazine Ulk in 1910.  From 1912 until 1917 he studied at the Berlin College of Arts and Crafts under Emil Orlik. He began painting in oils in 1912.

In November 1914 Grosz volunteered for military service, in the hope that by thus preempting conscription he would avoid being sent to the front. He was given a discharge after hospitalization for sinusitis in 1915. In 1916 he changed the spelling of his name to "de-Germanise" and internationalise his name – thus Georg became "George" (an English spelling), while in his surname he replaced the German "ß" with its phonetic equivalent "sz". He did this as a protest against German nationalism and out of a romantic enthusiasm for America – a legacy of his early reading of the books of James Fenimore Cooper, Bret Harte and Karl May – that he retained for the rest of his life. His artist friend  and collaborator Helmut Herzfeld likewise changed his name to John Heartfield at the same time.

In January 1917 Grosz was drafted for service, but in May he was discharged as permanently unfit.

Political engagement, 1918 to 1920

Following the November Revolution in the last months of 1918, Grosz joined the Spartacist League, which was renamed the Communist Party of Germany (KPD) in December 1918. He was arrested during the Spartakus uprising in January 1919, but escaped using fake identification documents. In 1920 he married Eva Peters. 

In the same year he published a collection of his drawings, titled Gott mit uns ("God with us"), a satire on German society. Grosz was accused of insulting the army, which resulted in a 300 German Mark fine and the confiscation of the plates used to print the album.

Trip to Russia, 1922/1923
In 1922 Grosz traveled to Russia with the Norwegian writer Martin Andersen Nexø. Upon their arrival in Murmansk they were briefly arrested as spies; after their credentials were approved, they were allowed to continue their journey. He met with several Bolshevik leaders such as Grigory Zinoviev, Karl Radek, and Vladimir Lenin. He went with Arthur Holitscher to meet Anatoly Lunacharsky with whom he discussed Proletkult. He rejected the concept of "proletarian culture", arguing that the term proletarian meant uneducated and uncultured. He regarded artistic talent as a "gift of the muses", which a person may be lucky enough to be born with. There he also met the Constructivist artist Vladimir Tatlin.

Grosz's six-month stay in the Soviet Union left him unimpressed by what he had seen. He ended his membership in the KPD in 1923, although his political positions were little changed.

Later activities in Germany
According to Grosz's son Martin Grosz, during the 1920s Nazi officers visited Grosz's studio looking for him, but because he was wearing a working man's apron Grosz was able to pass himself off as a handyman and avoid being taken into custody. His work was also part of the painting event in the art competition at the 1928 Summer Olympics.

In 1928 he was prosecuted for blasphemy after publishing anticlerical drawings, such as one depicting prisoners under assault from a minister who vomits grenades and weapons onto them, and another showing Christ coerced into military service. According to historian David Nash, Grosz "publicly stated that he was neither Christian nor pacifist, but was actively motivated by an inner need to create these pictures", and was finally acquitted after two appeals.  By contrast, in 1942 Time magazine identified Grosz as a pacifist.

Emigration to the U.S.
Bitterly anti-Nazi, Grosz left Germany shortly before Hitler came to power. In June 1932, he accepted an invitation to teach the summer semester at the Art Students League of New York. In October 1932, Grosz returned to Germany, but on January 12, 1933, he and his family emigrated to the United States. Grosz became a naturalized citizen of the U.S. in 1938, and made his home in Bayside, New York. In the 1930s he taught at the Art Students League, where one of his students was Romare Bearden, who was influenced by his style of collage. Grosz taught at the Art Students League until 1955. His other students included Robert Cenedella, whom he mentored from 1957 to 1959.

In America, Grosz determined to make a clean break with his past, and changed his style and subject matter. He continued to exhibit regularly, and in 1946 he published his autobiography, A Little Yes and a Big No. 
From 1947 to 1959, George Grosz lived in Huntington, New York, where he taught painting at the Huntington Township Art League. It is said by Huntington locals that he used what was to become his most famous painting, Eclipse of the Sun, to pay for a car repair bill, in his relative penury. The painting was later acquired by house painter Tom Constantine to settle a debt of $104.00.
In the 1950s he opened a private art school at his home and also worked as Artist in Residence at the Des Moines Art Center. Grosz was elected into the National Academy of Design as an Associate Academician in 1950. In 1954 he was elected to the American Academy of Arts and Letters.

Personal life and death
On May 26, 1920, Grosz married Eva Louise Peter and had two sons, Peter Michael Grosz (1926–2006) and Marty Grosz (born 1930), a jazz guitarist.

Grosz resolved to return to Berlin, and relocated there in May 1959.
He died there on July 6, 1959, from the effects of falling down a flight of stairs after a night of drinking.

Work
Although Grosz made his first oil paintings in 1912 while still a student,
his earliest oils that can be identified date from 1916.
By 1914, Grosz worked in a style influenced by Expressionism and Futurism, as well as by popular illustration, graffiti, and children's drawings. Sharply outlined forms are often treated as if transparent. The City (1916–17) was the first of his many paintings of the modern urban scene. Other examples include the apocalyptic Explosion (1917), Metropolis (1917), and The Funeral, a 1918 painting depicting a mad funeral procession. He settled in Berlin in 1918 and was a founder of the Berlin Dada movement, using his satirical drawings to attack bourgeois supporters of the Weimar Republic.

His drawings, usually in pen and ink which he sometimes developed further with watercolor, frequently included images of Berlin and the Weimar Republic in the 1920s.  Corpulent businessmen, wounded soldiers, prostitutes, sex crimes and orgies were his great subjects (for example, see Fit for Active Service). His draftsmanship was excellent although the works for which he is best known adopt a deliberately crude form of caricature in the style of Jugend. His oeuvre includes a few absurdist works, such as Remember Uncle August the Unhappy Inventor which has buttons sewn on it, and also includes a number of erotic artworks.

After his emigration to the USA in 1933, Grosz "sharply rejected [his] previous work, and caricature in general." In place of his earlier corrosive vision of the city, he now painted conventional nudes and many landscape watercolors. More acerbic works, such as Cain, or Hitler in Hell (1944), were the exception. In his autobiography, he wrote: "A great deal that had become frozen within me in Germany melted here in America and I rediscovered my old yearning for painting. I carefully and deliberately destroyed a part of my past." Although a softening of his style had been apparent since the late 1920s, Grosz's work assumed a more sentimental tone in America, a change generally seen as a decline. His late work never achieved the critical success of his Berlin years. 

In 1968, the Heckscher Museum of Art in Huntington purchased the painting Eclipse of the Sun for $15,000.00, raising the money by public subscription. As  it portrays the warmongering of arms manufacturers, this painting became a destination of protesters of the Vietnam War in Heckscher Park (where the museum is sited) in the late 1960s and early 70s.

In 2006, the Heckscher proposed selling Eclipse of the Sun at its then-current appraisal of approximately $19,000,000.00 to pay for repairs and renovations to the building. There was such public outcry that the museum decided not to sell, and announced plans to create a dedicated space for display of the painting in the renovated museum.

Legacy and estate
Grosz's art influenced other New Objectivity artists such as Heinrich Maria Davringhausen, Anton Räderscheidt, and Georg Scholz. In the United States, the artists influenced by his work included the social realists Ben Shahn and William Gropper.

In 1960, Grosz was the subject of the Oscar-nominated short film George Grosz' Interregnum. He is fictionalized as "Fritz Falke" in Arthur R.G. Solmssen's novel A Princess in Berlin (1980). In 2002, actor Kevin McKidd portrayed Grosz in a supporting role as an eager artist seeking exposure in Max, regarding Adolf Hitler's youth.

The Grosz estate filed a lawsuit in 1995 against the Manhattan art dealer Serge Sabarsky, arguing that Sabarsky had deprived the estate of appropriate compensation for the sale of hundreds of Grosz works he had acquired. In the suit, filed in New York Supreme Court in Manhattan, the Grosz estate claims that Sabarsky secretly acquired 440 Grosz works for himself, primarily drawings and watercolors produced in Germany in the 1910s and 20s. The lawsuit was settled in summer in 2006.

In 2003 the Grosz family initiated a legal battle against the Museum of Modern Art in New York City, asking that three paintings be returned. According to documents, the paintings were sold to the Nazis after Grosz fled the country in 1933. The museum never settled the claim, arguing that a three-year statute of limitations in bringing such a claim had expired. It is well documented that the Nazis stole thousands of paintings during World War II and many heirs of German painters continue to fight museums in order to reclaim such works.

In 2015, Ralph Jentsch – the managing director of the Grosz estate since 1994 – co-founded a Berlin-based nonprofit organization dedicated to the artist. In 2022, the Little Grosz Museum (Kleines Grosz Museum) opened in Berlin's Schöneberg district. Housed in a midcentury former gas station that was converted to a living space in 2008, the museum is funded by private donors and also houses a café and shop.

Quotes
 "My Drawings expressed my despair, hate and disillusionment, I drew drunkards; puking men; men with clenched fists cursing at the moon. ... I drew a man, face filled with fright, washing blood from his hands ... I drew lonely little men fleeing madly through empty streets. I drew a cross-section of tenement house: through one window could be seen a man attacking his wife; through another, two people making love; from a third hung a suicide with body covered by swarming flies. I drew soldiers without noses; war cripples with crustacean-like steel arms; two medical soldiers putting a violent infantryman into a strait-jacket made of a horse blanket ... I drew a skeleton dressed as a recruit being examined for military duty. I also wrote poetry." — George Grosz

See also
 Jedermann sein eigner Fussball, an artists' book by George Grosz and John Heartfield
 Assoziation revolutionärer bildender Künstler, an association of German artists
 List of German painters

Bibliography
 Bergius, Hanne Das Lachen Dadas. Die Berliner Dadaisten und ihre Aktionen. Gießen: Anabas-Verlag, 1989. 
 Bergius, H. Montage und Metamechanik. Dada Berlin – Ästhetik von Polaritäten (mit Rekonstruktion der Ersten Internationalen Dada-Messe und Dada-Chronologie) Berlin: Gebr. Mann Verlag 2000. 
 Bergius, H. Dada Triumphs! Dada Berlin, 1917–1923. Artistry of Polarities. Montages – Metamechanics – Manifestations. Translated by Brigitte Pichon. Vol. V. of the ten editions of Crisis and the Arts. The History of Dada, ed. by Stephen Foster, New Haven, Conn. u. a., Thomson/ Gale 2003. 
 Grosz, George (1946). A Little Yes and a Big No. New York: The Dial Press.
 Kranzfelder, Ivo (2005). George Grosz. Cologne: Taschen. 
 Michalski, Sergiusz (1994). New Objectivity. Cologne: Taschen. 
 Sabarsky, Serge, editor (1985). George Grosz: The Berlin Years. New York: Rizzoli. 
 Schmied, Wieland (1978). Neue Sachlichkeit and German Realism of the Twenties. London: Arts Council of Great Britain. 
 Vogel, Carol (7 October 2006) "Peter M. Grosz, 80, Authority on Early German Aircraft, Dies" (obituary, Grosz's son), The New York Times
 Walker, B., Zieve, K., & Brooklyn Museum. (1988). Prints of the German expressionists and their circle: Collection of the Brooklyn Museum. New York: Brooklyn Museum.

References

External links

 
 
 A collection of Grosz's paintings ABC Gallery
 Ten Dreams Galleries
 Mario Vargas Llosa on George Grosz in TATE ETC. magazine Spring 2007
 Das Kleine Grosz Museum, Berlin
 

George Grosz
1893 births
1959 deaths
20th-century American painters
American male painters
20th-century German painters
20th-century German male artists
German male painters
Artists from Berlin
Modern painters
German watercolourists
German Expressionist painters
German caricaturists
German Army personnel of World War I
Art Students League of New York faculty
German communists
German emigrants to the United States
German pacifists
Exiles from Nazi Germany
Political artists
Olympic competitors in art competitions
German dadaists
Members of the American Academy of Arts and Letters